Norgay may refer to:

Nepalese-Sherpa descended mountaineers:
 Tenzing Norgay (1915–1986), for whom it was a given name, often mistaken for a surname
 Tenzing Montes (formerly called 'Norgay Montes') mounts on Pluto in honour of Tenzing Norgay 
 Jamling Tenzing Norgay (born 1965), who intentionally uses it as a surname

See also 
 Norge (disambiguation)